József Haluzsinsky was a Hungarian athlete. He competed in the men's high jump at the 1908 Summer Olympics.

References

Year of birth missing
Year of death missing
Athletes (track and field) at the 1908 Summer Olympics
Hungarian male high jumpers
Olympic athletes of Hungary
Place of birth missing
Olympic male high jumpers